Denis Ivanovich Zubko (born 7 November 1974) is an association football coach and a former player who played striker.

Honours
 Russian Premier League runner-up: 1997.
 Top 33 players year-end list: 1996.

International career
Zubko played his first game for Russia on 30 April 1997 in a 1998 FIFA World Cup qualifier against Luxembourg. He played 3 more games for the national team.

External links 
 Player profile 

1974 births
Living people
People from Petrozavodsk
Russian footballers
Russia international footballers
Russian expatriate footballers
Expatriate footballers in Switzerland
Expatriate footballers in Kazakhstan
FC Baden players
FC Zenit Saint Petersburg players
FC Rotor Volgograd players
FC Kuban Krasnodar players
FC Atyrau players
FC Ural Yekaterinburg players
FC Akhmat Grozny players
FC Energiya Volzhsky players
Russian Premier League players
Kazakhstan Premier League players
Russian expatriate sportspeople in Kazakhstan
Russian football managers
Association football forwards
FC Zenit-2 Saint Petersburg players
Sportspeople from the Republic of Karelia